George Glyde (1821 – 24 January 1898) was an early settler of Western Australia. He arrived in the colony as a child in 1830, and became a prominent merchant and businessman. Glyde was chairman of the Perth Town Council (the equivalent of mayor) from 1869 to 1873. He later served three terms as a nominated member of Legislative Council, from 1874 to 1879, from 1882 to 1885, and from 1892 to 1894.

Early life and business career
Glyde was born in Yeovil, Somerset, England, to Susannah (née Hallet) and William Glyde. He and his parents arrived in Western Australia in 1830, travelling aboard Rockingham (one of Thomas Peel's ships). They initially lived in Peel's settlement, Clarence, but that failed after a few years and they moved north to Fremantle and then to Perth. In 1841, Glyde began working for Lionel Samson's company in Fremantle. He eventually went into business on his own, running a general store and draper's shop. He also helped to found Perth's first building society, serving as a director from 1862 and as president from 1875.

Politics and later life
In 1867, Glyde was elected to the Perth Town Council. He served as chairman (the equivalent of mayor) from 1869 to 1873, and was in office when the Perth Town Hall was opened in 1870. In June 1874, Glyde was nominated to the Legislative Council by the governor, Frederick Weld. He resigned in October 1879, but was later reappointed for two further terms, serving from July 1882 to July 1885 and again from March 1892 to June 1894. Glyde died at his home on Adelaide Terrace, Perth, in January 1898. He had married Alice Draper in 1843, with whom he had five sons and six daughters.

See also
 List of mayors and lord mayors of Perth

References

1821 births
1898 deaths
Australian merchants
English emigrants to Australia
Mayors and Lord Mayors of Perth, Western Australia
Members of the Western Australian Legislative Council
People from Yeovil
Settlers of Western Australia
19th-century Australian businesspeople
19th-century Australian politicians